Tipping point or  TippingPoint or The Tipping Point may refer to:

Science and technology
 Tipping point (physics), a threshold in a sharp hysteresis loop; once reached, the system rapidly changes its state
 Tipping point (sociology), an event when a previously rare phenomenon becomes rapidly and dramatically more common
 Tipping point, in catastrophe theory, the value of the parameter in which the set of equilibria abruptly changes
 Tipping points in the climate system, thresholds that, when exceeded, can lead to large changes in the state of the system

As a proper name

Arts, entertainment, and media

Literature
 The Tipping Point, a 2000 book by Malcolm Gladwell

Music
 Tipping Point (band), an experimental contemporary jazz quartet from England, founded in 2013
 The Tipping Point (Authority Zero album), 2013
 The Tipping Point (The Roots album), 2004
 The Tipping Point (Tears for Fears album), 2022

Television
 Tipping Point (game show), a British game show
 "Tipping Point", an episode of CSI: Miami
 "The Tipping Point" (The Outer Limits), a TV episode

Other uses as a proper name
 Tipping Point Community, a US philanthropic organization
 TippingPoint, a network security company

Other uses
Tipping-point state, in US presidential elections, the state that secures a candidate's victory, when all states are arranged in order of their vote margins

See also
 Inflection point
 Tip (disambiguation)
 Tipping (disambiguation)